Capital College may refer to:

 Penn State Harrisburg, U.S., also called The Capital College
 Capital Community College, Hartford, Connecticut, U.S.
 Lancaster Bible College Capital Seminary and Graduate School, in Lancaster, Pennsylvania, U.S.
 Capital University, in Bexley, Ohio, U.S.
 Capital University, Jharkhand, India

See also
 Capitol University, in Cagayan de Oro City, Philippines
 Capitol Technology University, in South Laurel, Maryland, U.S.